Taedong County is a kun (county) in South Pyongan province, North Korea.

Taedong or Daedong may also refer to:

 Daedong College, Busan, South Korea
 Daedong Corporation, a South Korean agricultural machinery manufacturing company
 Daedong Credit Bank, Pyongyang, North Korea
 Taedong River, North Korea
 Taedongmun, a gate of Pyongyang Castle